Shapkino may refer to the following places in Russia:

 Shapkino, Mordovia
 Shapkino, Mozhaysky District, Moscow Oblast
 Shapkino, Tambov Oblast
 Shapkino, Vologda Oblast